Nasva is a small borough in Saaremaa Parish, Saare County in western Estonia. It has a population of 454 (as of 1 January 2011).

The mouth of Nasva River is located in Nasva.

Shipbuilding companies Baltic Workboats and Saare Yachts are located in Nasva.

References

Boroughs and small boroughs in Estonia